Christian Donovan Clemons (born September 15, 1985) is a former American football safety. He was drafted by the Miami Dolphins in the fifth round of the 2009 NFL Draft. He played college football at Clemson University.

Early life 
Clemons attended Desoto County High School in his hometown of Arcadia, Florida. He graduated in 2004.

Professional career

Miami Dolphins
Clemons was drafted by the Miami Dolphins in the fifth round of the 2009 NFL Draft. In Week 12 against the Oakland Raiders, Clemons recorded his first career interception in a 33-17 victory.

Set to become an unrestricted free agent for 2013 season, Clemons re-signed with the Dolphins on a one-year contract on March 12, 2013.

Houston Texans
On March 26, 2014, Clemons agreed to terms on a two-year contract with the Houston Texans. He was released on August 31, 2014.

Arizona Cardinals
Clemons signed with the Arizona Cardinals on December 8, 2014.

On October 9, 2015, after reaching an injury settlement, Clemons was released by the Cardinals. On December 22, 2015, Clemons was re-signed by the Cardinals after free safety Tyrann Mathieu went down with a season-ending ACL injury.

On September 3, 2016, Clemons was released by the Cardinals.

Personal life
Clemons was found guilty and sentenced to 10 days in jail for assaulting a woman outside an Arizona night club in May 2016.

References

External links

Arizona Cardinals bio
Houston Texans bio
Miami Dolphins bio

1985 births
Living people
People from Arcadia, Florida
Sportspeople from Bradenton, Florida
Players of American football from Florida
American football safeties
Clemson Tigers football players
Miami Dolphins players
Houston Texans players
Arizona Cardinals players